"Hey Everybody (Out of Control)" is the debut single by German Eurodance project DJ Company. It was released under the record label Dance Pool in 1994, and charted at number 1 on the Canadian Dance chart for 3 weeks. It was released as a CD maxi-single and on Dance Pool Vol. 3 (a Canadian compilation). A remixes CD was released the same year. The single features January Ordu as the lead vocalist, along with dancers/rappers Brian Thomas and Michael Fielder.

Charts

References

External links
 http://www.releaselyrics.com/2fc1/dj-company-hey-everybody/

1994 songs
1994 debut singles
DJ Company songs
Dance Pool singles
Epic Records singles